"Into the Fire" is a song by American heavy metal band Dokken, released in 1984 on the album Tooth and Nail. The song peaked at number 21 on the Hot Mainstream Rock Tracks chart in the United States.
It was featured in the 1987 film A Nightmare on Elm Street 3: Dream Warriors along with a title track named after the film. The song was absent on the VHS release but was reinstated on the original DVD release and all future releases thereon.

In 2019, the song was used as the theme music to the National Wrestling Alliance's weekly wrestling show, NWA Power, and was the namesake for their pay-per-view event, NWA Into the Fire.
In a 2010 interview George Lynch stated the song was inspired by the Judas Priest song "Some Heads Are Gonna Roll".

Track listing

Chart positions

Personnel
 Don Dokken – lead vocals
 George Lynch – guitar
 Jeff Pilson – bass guitar, backing vocals
 Mick Brown – drums

References

1984 songs
1984 singles
Dokken songs
Glam metal ballads
A Nightmare on Elm Street (franchise) music
Elektra Records singles
Songs written by George Lynch (musician)
Songs written by Jeff Pilson
Songs written by Don Dokken
Songs about Freddy Krueger